Parlak is a Turkish surname. Notable people with the surname include:

 Başak Parlak (born 1989), Turkish actress and model
 Birol Parlak (born 1990), Turkish footballer
 İbrahim Parlak, Turkish refugee
 İlhan Parlak (born 1987), Turkish footballer

Turkish-language surnames